The Charlestown Bridge, officially named the North Washington Street Bridge, is located in Boston and spans the Charles River. As the river's easternmost crossing, the bridge connects the neighborhoods of Charlestown and the North End. Completed in 1900 and given its current official name in 1910, the bridge carries a portion of the Freedom Trail linking to the USS Constitution and Bunker Hill. To the north of the bridge, Route 99 begins and the street becomes New Rutherford Avenue.

Replacement of the bridge started in fall 2018 and is expected to be completed in 2023.

History

The first government-sanctioned ferry crossing of the Charles was chartered at this location in the 1630s. It was operated by various individuals until it was given to Harvard College "in perpetuity" in 1640, to support the college financially. In 1640, the Massachusetts General Court granted Harvard College the revenue from the Boston-Charlestown ferry to help support the institution. The Harvard Corporation in its capacity managed the Charlestown ferry from the 1640s until 1785, and after the completion of the Charles River Bridge in 1785.

The first bridge on this site was known as the Charles River Bridge, chartered in 1785 and opened on June 17, 1786. As a condition of chartering the bridge, a sum of £200 was paid annually to Harvard College to compensate for the lost ferry income. The bridge was privately built and operated, with tolls producing profits for the investors during the charter period, after the initial expense was paid off. In 1792, the West Boston Bridge was chartered, connecting West Boston to Cambridge.  In compensation, the legislature extended the charter period of the Charles River Bridge by 30 years, but the unpopular double tolls on Sundays were eliminated.  Traffic to the bridge was facilitated by the laying out of the Medford Turnpike in 1803.

When the Warren Bridge was chartered in 1828 in a location extremely close to the Charles River Bridge, the investors filed a lawsuit which eventually reached the United States Supreme Court as Charles River Bridge v. Warren Bridge.

The current bridge was built in 1900 under chief engineer William Jackson, and was designed to carry the Charlestown Elevated railway in addition to vehicle traffic. However, the railway was demolished in 1975 to make way for its replacement, the MBTA Orange Line's Haymarket North Extension. The new line was rerouted to avoid having to pass directly through the densely populated Charlestown neighborhood. The Haymarket Tunnel, emerging from under both North Station and the Charles River just south of the new Orange Line Community College station, was inaugurated in 1975 as the designated tunnel for Orange Line trains. Because the bridge was originally designed to accommodate an elevated railroad in addition to automobiles, the bridge spans six lanes.

The bridge formerly carried the southernmost stretch of Massachusetts Route 99 to its terminus at the river, but following completion of the Big Dig in the late 2000s, the route's designation was changed to relocate the terminus to Chelsea Street in Charlestown.

Replacement

The bridge has been considered structurally deficient since 2003, when the center two lanes were permanently closed. Construction work on a replacement bridge began in the fall of 2018. The design for the new bridge, by architect Miguel Rosales in collaboration with Alfred Benesch & Co., is intended to complement the nearby Zakim Bridge (with which Rosales was also involved). The new bridge is slated to have two vehicular lanes in each direction, a dedicated southbound bus lane, and a protected bicycle lane and sidewalk on each side. During construction, a temporary bridge has been installed to carry pedestrians and three lanes of vehicular traffic.

The new $180 million Charlestown bridge was expected to be completed in 2023 to coincide with the 20th anniversary of the Zakim Bridge, but due to defects discovered on September 29, 2021 in some of the welds/connections of a portion of the installed steel tub girders, the project has been delayed indefinitely.

Gallery

See also
List of crossings of the Charles River

References

External links

 
 Various photos, 1899-1929
 Article with early 1800s photo

Charlestown, Boston
Bridges in Boston
Landmarks in Charlestown, Boston
Railroad bridges in Massachusetts
Bridges completed in 1900
North End, Boston
Former toll bridges in Massachusetts
Bridges over the Charles River
Plate girder bridges in the United States
1900 establishments in Massachusetts